Elwood Albert Geiges (August 26, 1895 – October 22, 1977) was an American football player, coach, and official.  He was the eighth head football coach at Temple University and he held that position for the 1917 season.  His record at Temple was 0–6–1.

Head coaching record

College football

References

1895 births
1977 deaths
American football quarterbacks
Basketball coaches from Pennsylvania
Basketball players from Philadelphia
Haverford Fords football coaches
Temple Owls football coaches
Temple Owls football players
Temple Owls men's basketball coaches
High school football coaches in Pennsylvania
Sportspeople from Philadelphia